The imperial blackfish, Schedophilus ovalis, is a medusafish of the family Centrolophidae found in the eastern Atlantic and the Mediterranean Sea, and occasionally western Atlantic (Bermuda). It occurs at depths of between 70 and 700 m. In its juvenile stage it is often found finding shelter amongst of the tentacles of floating jellyfish, including the Portuguese man o' war. It grows to  total length.

References

Centrolophidae
Fish of the East Atlantic
Fish of the Mediterranean Sea
Fauna of Bermuda
imperial blackfish
Taxa named by Georges Cuvier